Termen-Yelga is a microdistrict of the town of Ishimbay, Republic of Bashkortostan, Russia, located in the southeastern part of the town, on the banks of the Termen-Yelga and Sarazh Rivers, and near the mountains Tashlygyrtau, Kyzyltau and Atastau.

Since 1760, Termen-Yelga has been known as a village of the Bashkir tribe Yurmaty, named Termen and also Termen-Ilgina. At the end of the 18th century, the population was 137.

References

Ishimbay